Adelphocoris is a genus of capsid bugs in the tribe Mirini.  It is part of a genus group that now includes Creontiades, Megacoelum and Pseudomegacoelum.

Species
The following species are included:

Adelphocoris aethiopicus Poppius, 1912
Adelphocoris albonotatus (Jakovlev, 1881)
Adelphocoris bimaculicollis Lindberg, 1948
Adelphocoris brunnescens Poppius, 1915
Adelphocoris corallinus Kerzhner, 1988
Adelphocoris demissus Horvath, 1905
Adelphocoris detritus (Fieber, 1861)
Adelphocoris dinsmorei Bliven, 1959
Adelphocoris divergens Reuter, 1906
Adelphocoris fasciaticollis Reuter, 1903
Adelphocoris fasciiger Reuter, 1906
Adelphocoris ferrugineus Hsiao, 1962
Adelphocoris fijiensis Kerzhner & Schuh, 1995
Adelphocoris flavovirens Yasunaga, 1996
Adelphocoris funestus Reuter, 1903
Adelphocoris fuscicornis Hsiao, 1962
Adelphocoris hercynicus Wagner, 1938
Adelphocoris idahoensis Bliven, 1959
Adelphocoris insignis Horvath, 1898
Adelphocoris insularis Poppius, 1915
Adelphocoris josifovi Wagner, 1968
Adelphocoris laeviusculus Vinokurov, 1976
Adelphocoris lineolatus (Goeze, 1778)
Adelphocoris luridus Reuter, 1906
Adelphocoris melanocephalus Reuter, 1903
Adelphocoris minor Wagner, 1969
Adelphocoris nigritylus Hsiao, 1962
Adelphocoris obliquefasciatus Lindberg, 1934
Adelphocoris piceosetosus Kulik, 1965
Adelphocoris ponghvariensis Josifov, 1978
Adelphocoris quadripunctatus (Fabricius, 1794)
Adelphocoris rapidus (Say, 1832)
Adelphocoris reicheli (Fieber, 1836)
Adelphocoris rufescens Hsiao, 1962
Adelphocoris seticornis (Fabricius, 1775)
Adelphocoris sichuanus Kerzhner & Schuh, 1995
Adelphocoris sumatranus Poppius, 1915
Adelphocoris superbus (Uhler, 1875)
Adelphocoris suturalis (Jakovlev, 1882)
Adelphocoris taeniophorus Reuter, 1906
Adelphocoris tenebrosus (Reuter, 1875)
Adelphocoris thoracatus (Stal, 1855)
Adelphocoris tibetanus Zheng & H. Li, 1990
Adelphocoris ticinensis (Meyer-Dur, 1843)
Adelphocoris torquatus Reuter, 1906
Adelphocoris triannulatus (Stal, 1858)
Adelphocoris vandalicus (Rossi, 1790)
Adelphocoris variabilis (Uhler, 1897)
Adelphocoris vinokurovi Yasunaga, 1996
Adelphocoris yunnanensis Zheng & H. Li, 1990
Adelphocoris zoui Zheng & H. Li, 1990

References

Miridae genera
Mirini